"Beat It" is a song by Michael Jackson.

Beat It may also refer to:

Music
 "Beat It" (Sean Kingston song), 2013
"Beat It", 1967 song by Tony Cole
"Beat It", 1980 song by Klaus Klang

Other
 Beat It (film), a 1918 American short comedy film featuring Harold Lloyd
 Beat It!, a 2009 video game

See also
 "Eat It", a 1984 parody song by "Weird Al" Yankovic
 Beat It Up (disambiguation)